Dominis is a surname. Notable people with the surname include:

John Dominis (1921–2013), American Documentary photographer, war photographer and photojournalist
John ʻAimoku Dominis (1883-1917), son of John Owen Dominis
John Owen Dominis (1832–1891), American-born statesman
John Dominis Holt II (1861-1915), Hawaiian military leader
John Dominis Holt IV (1919-1993), Hawaiian writer
Marco Antonio de Dominis (1566–1624), Dalmatian ecclesiastic, apostate, and man of science
Mary Dominis (1803-1889), American settler of Hawaii

See also
Dominis Conspiracy (Hawaii), also known as the Wilcox Rebellion of 1888